The 2005 Temple Owls football team represented Temple University in the college 2005 NCAA Division I-A football season. Temple competed as an independent.  The team was coached by Bobby Wallace and played their homes game in Lincoln Financial Field.

The Owls scored 107 points and gave up 498 points.

Schedule

Roster

References

Temple
Temple Owls football seasons
College football winless seasons
Temple Owls football